The Leiden Bio Science park (LBSP) is the largest life sciences cluster in the Netherlands and ranks in the top five of the most successful science parks in Europe. It is part of  Leiden and Oegstgeest and focuses on companies and universities in the Biotechnology sector.

The park comprises 110 hectares (272 acres) with over 215 organisations, including 150 Life Sciences & Health companies. The park is located mostly in Leiden and lies between Wassenaarseweg on the north and the Plesmanlaan on the south.

The park focuses mostly on the use of biotechnology for medical and biopharmaceutical applications.

History 
The LBSP was founded in 1984 in the Leeuwenhoek area west of Leiden Central Station, between the Faculty of Science of the Leiden University and the former Academic Medical Hospital Leiden, now known as the Leiden University Medical Center (LUMC). The municipality decided that this area should primarily be focused on biotechnology.

In 2005 the foundation Leiden Life meets Science was founded by the Leiden University, the municipality Leiden, the LUMC, the Netherlands Organisation for Applied Scientific Research (TNO), the Naturalis Biodiversity Center, Chamber of Commerce, the province South Holland, the University of Applied Sciences Leiden, and the ROC Leiden, with the purpose of growth the park in size and quality.

Research and Education 
 Alrijne Ziekenhuis Leiden
 Biotech Training Facility
 Boerhaave Nascholing
 Centre of Human Drug Research (CHDR)
 Centre for Science and Technology Studies (CWTS)
 Corpus museum
 Dutch Institute for Clinical Auditing (DICA)
 Leiden Academic Centre for Drug Research (LACDR)
 Leiden instrumentmakers School (LiS)
 Leiden University
 Leiden University Medical Center (LUMC)
 MBO Rijnland, Laboratory studies
 Naturalis Biodiversity Center
 Netherlands Organisation for Applied Scientific Research (TNO)
 University of Applied Sciences Leiden (UAS Leiden)

Companies

References

External links 
 Leiden Bio Science Park - official website

Science parks in the Netherlands
Leiden University
Economy of Leiden
Life sciences industry
1984 establishments in the Netherlands